Arguably: Essays is a 2011 book by Christopher Hitchens, comprising 107 essays on a variety of political and cultural topics. These essays were previously published in The Atlantic, City Journal, Foreign Affairs, The Guardian, Newsweek, New Statesman, The New York Times Book Review, Slate, Times Literary Supplement, The Wall Street Journal, The Weekly Standard, The Wilson Quarterly, and Vanity Fair. Arguably also includes introductions that Hitchens wrote for new editions of several classic texts, such as Animal Farm and Our Man in Havana. Critics' reviews of the collection were largely positive.

Reception
In a highly positive review, Fred Inglis of The Independent called Hitchens a "prose master" and lauded the author's skill as a polemicist, writing that various figures are "lined up, arraigned, swiftly appraised and, with a perfect and merciless justice, judged and sentenced." Inglis also praised the essays of literary criticism as "very well written, so funny and fluent, so loving and so pungent." In Kirkus Reviews it was written, "Sometimes his pieces concern passing matters, though they are seldom ephemeral themselves [...] Vintage Hitchens. Argumentative and sometimes just barely civil—another worthy collection from this most inquiring of inquirers."

Charles Foran of The Globe and Mail lauded Arguably as "750 pages of bright, witty, nearly always charged reportage and argument", and wrote that the work "lays the foundation for Hitchens's enduring relevance as an essayist and commentator." Bill Keller of The New York Times called Hitchens "our intellectual omnivore, exhilarating and infuriating, if not in equal parts at least with equal wit", describing his range as "extraordinary, both in breadth and in altitude." Nicholas Shakespeare of The Daily Telegraph praised the book as "tremendous" and wrote, "I can’t think of anyone who brings to such a diverse range of subjects Hitchens’s mobilising wit, intelligence and passion."

In the New Statesman, John Gray criticized Hitchens's views on 21st century terrorism and said the author sometimes "blanks out reality when it fails to accord with his faith", but nonetheless referred to Arguably as "the testament of a prodigiously gifted mind" and lauded him as "one of the greatest living writers of English prose", especially praising the essay "The Vietnam Syndrome". In a mixed review for The Observer, Finton O'Toole called Hitchens a "supremely evocative reporter" and "the most readable journalist of his time", but accused the journalist of "huge but unargued claims" and warned, "There are many sad moments when thought has withered into vacuity or bombast, moments in which we can see what Hitchens might have become – just another purveyor of American super-patriotic orthodoxies." O'Toole concluded that Hitchens "emerges here [...] as a great journalist fallen, for a while, among neocons."

In 2016, James Ley of The Sydney Morning Herald listed Arguably among the collections from Hitchens that "[represent] the best of his work as a journalist, literary critic and cultural commentator."

Awards and honors
 2011 New York Times Best Books of the Year
 2012 PEN/Diamonstein-Spielvogel Award for the Art of the Essay, winner

Books reviewed
 Moral Minority: Our Skeptical Founding Fathers, by Brooke Allen
 Jefferson's Secrets: Death and Desire at Monticello, by Andrew Burstein
 Power, Faith and Fantasy: America in the Middle East, 1776 to the Present, by Michael Oren
 Benjamin Franklin Unmasked, by Jerry Weinberger
 John Brown, Abolitionist, by David S. Reynolds
 Abraham Lincoln: A Life, by Michael Burlingame
 The Singular Mark Twain, by Fred Kaplan
 The Jungle, by Upton Sinclair
 An Unfinished Life: John F. Kennedy, 1917-1963, by Robert Dallek
 Novels 1944-1953: Dangling Man, The Victim, The Adventures of Augie March and Novels 1956-1964: Seize the Day, Henderson the Rain King, Herzog by Saul Bellow
 Lolita by Vladimir Nabokov and The Annotated Lolita, edited by Alfred Appel, Jr.
 Due Considerations: Essays and Criticism, by John Updike
 A History of the English-Speaking Peoples Since 1900, by Andrew Roberts
 Dominion: The Power of Man, the Suffering of Animals, and the Call to Mercy by Matthew Scully
 Wolf Hall, by Hilary Mantel
 Reflections on the Revolution in France, by Edmund Burke, edited by Frank W. Turner
 Samuel Johnson: A Biography, by Peter Martin
 Bouvard and Pecuchet by Gustave Flaubert, translated from French by Mark Polizotti
 Charles Dickens by Michael Slater
 Dispatches for the New York Tribune: Selected Journalism of Karl Marx, edited by James Ledbetter, with a foreword by Francis Wheen
 Ezra Pound: Poet, Vol 1. 1885-1920, by A. David Moody
 Decca: The Letters of Jessica Mitford, by Peter Y. Sussman
 Somerset Maugham: A Life, by Jeffrey Meyers
 Wodehouse: A Life, by Robert McCrum
 To Keep the Ball Rolling: The Memoirs of Anthony Powell
 John Buchan: The Presbyterian Cavalier, by Andrew Lownie
 The Life of Graham Greene, Vol II 1955-1991, by Norman Sherry
 Letters to Monica by Philip Larkin, edited by Anthony Thwaite
 Stephen Spender: The Authorized Biography, by John Sutherland
 C.L.R. James: Cricket, the Caribbean and the World Revolution, by Farrukh Dhondy
 The Complete Stories of J. G. Ballard
 The Unbearable Saki, by Sandie Byrne
 Harry Potter and the Deathly Hallows, by J. K. Rowling
 A Savage War of Peace: Algeria 1954-1962, by Alistair Horne
 Dangerous Knowledge: Orientalism and Its Discontents, by Robert Irwin
 Orientalism, by Edward Said
 Freedom's Battle: The Origins of Humanitarian Intervention, by Gary J. Bass
 The Case of Comrade Tulayev and Memoirs of a Revolutionary, by Victor Serge
 Malraux: A Life, by Olivier Todd
 Koestler: The Literary and Political Odyssey of a Twentieth-Century Skeptic, by Michael Scammell
 Strange Times, My Dear: The PEN Antholody of Contemporary Iranian Literature, edited by Nahid Mozzaffari
 Koba the Dread: Laughter and the Twenty Million, by Martin Amis
 Hitler: 1889-1936: Hubris, by Ian Kershaw The Lesser Evil: Diaries 1945-1959, by Victor Klemperer
 Churchill, Hitler and the Unnecessary War, by Pat Buchanan
 Human Smoke, by Nicholson Baker
 On the Natural History of Destruction, by W.G. Sebald

Book introductions
 Black Lamb and Grey Falcon, by Rebecca West
 Animal Farm, by George Orwell
 Our Man in Havana, by Graham Greene
 The House of the Spirits'', by Isabel Allende

References

2011 non-fiction books
Essay collections
Books by Christopher Hitchens
Atlantic Books books
Twelve (publisher) books